Bosea robiniae is a bacterium from the genus of Bosea.

References

External links
Type strain of Bosea robiniae at BacDive -  the Bacterial Diversity Metadatabase

Hyphomicrobiales
Bacteria described in 2003